The Grand Canyon mid-air collision occurred in the western United States on Saturday, June 30, 1956, when a United Airlines Douglas DC-7 struck a Trans World Airlines Lockheed L-1049 Super Constellation over Grand Canyon National Park, Arizona.  All 128 on board both airplanes perished, making it the first commercial airline incident to exceed one hundred fatalities. The airplanes had departed Los Angeles International Airport minutes apart for Chicago and Kansas City, respectively.
The collision took place in uncontrolled airspace, where it was the pilots' responsibility to maintain separation ("see and be seen"). This highlighted the antiquated state of air traffic control, which became the focus of major aviation reforms.

Flight history

Trans World Airlines Flight 2, a Lockheed L-1049 Super Constellation named Star of the Seine, with Captain Jack Gandy (age 41), First Officer James Ritner (31), and Flight Engineer Forrest Breyfogle (37), departed Los Angeles on Saturday, June 30, 1956, at 9:01 am PST with 64 passengers (including 11 TWA off-duty employees on free tickets) and six crew members (including two flight attendants and an off-duty flight engineer), and headed to Kansas City Downtown Airport, 31 minutes behind schedule. At Daggett, Captain Gandy turned right to a heading of 059 degrees magnetic, toward the radio range near Trinidad, Colorado. The Constellation was now "off airways", otherwise known as flying in uncontrolled airspace.

United Airlines Flight 718, a Douglas DC-7 named Mainliner Vancouver, and flown by Captain Robert "Bob" Shirley (age 48), First Officer Robert Harms (36), and Flight Engineer Girardo "Gerard" Fiore (39), departed Los Angeles at 9:04 am PST with 53 passengers and 5 crew members aboard (including two flight attendants), bound for Chicago's Midway Airport. United's DC-7, though still under IFR, was now, like TWA's Constellation, en-route in uncontrolled airspace.

Shortly after takeoff TWA's Captain Gandy requested permission to climb to 21,000 feet to avoid thunderheads that were forming near his flight path. As was the practice at the time, his request had to be relayed by a TWA flight dispatcher to air traffic control (ATC), as neither crew was in direct contact with ATC after departure. ATC denied the request; the two airliners would soon be reentering controlled airspace (the Red 15 airway running southeast from Las Vegas) and ATC had no way to provide the horizontal separation required between two aircraft at the same altitude.

This was approved by ATC, and meant that the Constellation was still under IFR but free of separation restrictions normally applied by ATC. It transferred to Gandy and Ritner the responsibility for maintaining safe separation from other aircraft, on the principle then termed "see and be seen" (more recently "see and avoid").

This division of responsibilities between aircrew and ATC is especially useful when two aircraft are transitioning to or from an airfield approach when VFR conditions exist above cloud layers.  It is less common en-route. 

Both crews were then at this altitude, and both had estimated that they would cross the Painted Desert line at about 10:31 am Pacific time. Owing to the different headings taken by the two planes, TWA's crossing of the Painted Desert line, assuming no further course changes, would be at a 13-degree angle relative to that of the United flight, with the Constellation to the left of the DC-7.

As the two aircraft approached the Grand Canyon, at the same altitude and nearly the same speed, the pilots were likely maneuvering around towering cumulus clouds.  (The Constellation's clearance required it to stay in clear air – and above cloud.)  As they were maneuvering near the canyon, it is believed the planes passed the same cloud on opposite sides.

Collision 

At about 10:30 am the two aircraft collided over the canyon at an angle of about 25 degrees.  Post-crash analysis determined that the United DC-7 was banking to the right and pitching down at the time of the collision, suggesting that one or possibly both of the United pilots spotted the TWA Constellation and attempted evasive action.

The DC-7's upraised left wing clipped the top of the Constellation's vertical stabilizer and struck the fuselage immediately ahead of the stabilizer's base, causing the tail assembly to break away from the rest of the airframe. The propeller on the DC-7's left outboard, or number one engine, concurrently chopped a series of gashes into the bottom of the Constellation's fuselage. Explosive decompression would have instantaneously occurred from the damage, a theory substantiated by light debris, such as cabin furnishings and personal effects, being scattered over a large area.

The separation of the tail assembly from the Constellation resulted in immediate loss of control, causing the aircraft to enter a near-vertical, terminal velocity dive. An intense fire, fueled by aviation gasoline, ensued. The severed tail assembly, badly battered but still somewhat recognizable, came to rest nearby.

The DC-7's left wing to the left of the number one engine was mangled by the impact and was no longer capable of producing substantial lift. The engine had been severely damaged as well, and the combined loss of lift and propulsion left the crippled airliner in a rapidly descending left spiral from which recovery was impossible. The Mainliner collided with the south side cliff of Chuar Butte and disintegrated, instantly killing all aboard.

Aftermath

Search and recovery
The airspace over the canyon was not under any type of radar observation and there were no homing beacons, cockpit voice recorders or flight data recorders aboard either aircraft. The last position reports received from the flights did not reflect their locations at the time of the collision. Also, there were no credible witnesses to the collision itself or the subsequent crashes.

The only immediate indication of trouble was when United company radio operators in Salt Lake City and San Francisco heard a garbled transmission from Flight 718, the last from either aircraft. Civil Aeronautics Board (CAB) accident investigation engineers later deciphered the transmission – which had been preserved on magnetic tape – as the voice of co-pilot Robert Harms declaring, "Salt Lake, [ah], 718 ... we are going in!" The shrill voice of Captain Shirley was heard in the background as, presumably futilely struggling with the controls, he implored the airplane to "[Pull] up! [Pull] up!" (bracketed words were inferred by investigators from the context and circumstances in which they were uttered).

After neither flight reported their current position for some time, the two aircraft were declared to be missing, and search and rescue procedures started. The wreckage was first seen late in the day near the confluence of the Colorado and Little Colorado Rivers by Henry and Palen Hudgin, two brothers who operated Grand Canyon Airlines, a small air taxi service. During a trip earlier in the day, Palen had noted dense black smoke rising near Temple Butte, the crash site of the Constellation, but had dismissed it as brush set ablaze by lightning.

However, upon hearing of the missing airliners, Palen decided that what he had seen might have been smoke from a post-crash fire. He and his brother flew a light aircraft (a Piper Tri-Pacer) deep into the canyon and searched near the location of the smoke. The Constellation's empennage was found, and the brothers reported their findings to authorities. The following day, the two men pinpointed the wreckage of the DC-7. Numerous helicopter missions were subsequently flown down to the crash sites to find and attempt to identify victims, as well as recover wreckage for accident analysis, a difficult and dangerous process due to the rugged terrain and unpredictable air currents.

The airlines hired the Swiss Air-Rescue and some Swiss mountain climbers to go to the scene where the aircraft fuselages had crashed.  They were to gather the remains of the passengers and their personal effects.  This was given considerable publicity in U.S. news releases at the time because of the ruggedness of the terrain where the fuselages came to rest.

Owing to the great violence of the impacts, no bodies were recovered intact and positive identification of most of the remains was not possible. On July 9, 1956, a mass funeral for the victims of TWA Flight 2 was held at the canyon's south rim.  Twenty-nine unidentified victims of the United flight were interred in four coffins at the Grand Canyon Pioneer Cemetery. Sixty-six of the seventy TWA passengers and crew are buried in a mass grave at Citizens Cemetery in Flagstaff, Arizona. A number of years elapsed following this accident before most of the wreckage was removed from the canyon. Some pieces of the aircraft remain at the crash sites.

Investigation
The investigation of this accident was particularly challenging due to the remoteness and topography of the crash sites, as well as the extent of the destruction of the two airliners and the lack of real-time flight data as might be derived from a modern flight data recorder. Despite the considerable difficulties, CAB experts were able to determine with a remarkable degree of certainty what had transpired and, in their report, issued the following statement as probable cause for the accident:

In the report, weather and the airworthiness of the two planes were thought to have played no role in the accident. Lacking credible eyewitnesses and with some uncertainty regarding high altitude visibility at the time of the collision, it was not possible to determine conclusively how much opportunity was available for the TWA and United pilots to see and avoid each other.

Neither flight crew was specifically implicated in the CAB's finding of probable cause, although the decision by TWA's Captain Gandy to cancel his IFR flight plan and fly "1,000 on top" was the likely catalyst for the accident. Also worth noting was that the investigation itself was thorough in all respects, but the final report focused on technical issues and largely ignored contributory human factors, such as why the airlines permitted their pilots to execute maneuvers solely intended to improve the passengers' view of the canyon. It would not be until the late 1970s that human factors would be as thoroughly investigated as technical matters following aerial mishaps.

During the investigation, Milford "Mel" Hunter, a scientific and technical illustrator with Life magazine, was given early and unrestricted access to the CAB's data and preliminary findings, enabling him to produce an illustration of what likely occurred at the moment of the collision. Hunter's finely detailed gouache painting first appeared in Life April 29, 1957, issue and was subsequently included in David Gero's 1996 edition of Aviation Disasters II.

In a letter to Gero in 1995, Hunter wrote:

Hunter's recollection of his illustration was not completely accurate. The painting showed the DC-7 below the Constellation, with the former's number one engine beneath the latter's fuselage, which agreed with the CAB technical findings.

Catalyst for change

At 128 fatalities, the Grand Canyon collision became the deadliest U.S. commercial airline disaster and deadliest air crash on U.S. soil of any kind, surpassing United Airlines Flight 409 the year before. It was surpassed in both respects on December 16, 1960, by the 1960 New York mid-air collision (also involving United and TWA aircraft).

The accident was covered by the press worldwide, and as the story unfolded, the public learned of the primitive nature of air traffic control (ATC) and how little was being done to modernize it. The air traffic controller who had cleared TWA to "1,000 on top" was severely criticized as he had not advised Captains Gandy and Shirley about the potential for a traffic conflict following the clearance, even though he must have known of the possibility. The controller was publicly blamed for the accident by both airlines and was vilified in the press, but he was cleared of any wrongdoing. As Charles Carmody (the then-assistant ATC director) testified during the investigation, neither flight was legally under the control of ATC when they collided, as both were "off airways." The controller was not required to issue a traffic conflict advisory to either pilot.  According to the CAB accident investigation final report, page 8, the en-route controller relayed a traffic advisory regarding United 718 to TWA's ground radio operator: "ATC clears TWA 2, maintain at least 1,000 on top. Advise TWA 2 his traffic is United 718, direct Durango, estimating Needles at 0957." The TWA operator testified that Captain Gandy acknowledged the information on the United flight as "traffic received."

The accident was particularly alarming in that public confidence in air travel had increased during the 1950s with the introduction of new airliners like the Super Constellation, Douglas DC-7, and Boeing Stratocruiser. Travel by air had become routine for large corporations and vacationers often considered flying instead of traveling by train. At the time, a congressional committee was reviewing domestic air travel, as there was growing concern over the number of accidents. However, little progress was being made and the state of ATC at the time of the Grand Canyon accident reflected the methods of the 1930s.

As near-misses and mid-air collisions continued, the public demanded action. Often-contentious congressional hearings followed, and in 1957, increased funding was allocated to modernize ATC, hire and train more air traffic controllers, and procure much-needed radar – initially military surplus equipment.

However, control of American airspace continued to be split between the military and the Civil Aeronautics Administration (CAA, the federal agency in charge of air traffic control at the time). The CAA had no authority over military flights, which could enter controlled airspace with no warning to other traffic. The result was a series of near-misses and collisions involving civil and military aircraft, the latter often flying at much higher speeds than the former.  For example, in 1958, the collision of United Airlines Flight 736 flying "on-airways" and an F-100 Super Sabre fighter jet near Las Vegas, Nevada, resulted in 49 fatalities.

Again, action was demanded. After more hearings, the Federal Aviation Act of 1958 was passed, dissolving the CAA and creating the Federal Aviation Agency (FAA, later renamed the Federal Aviation Administration in 1966). The FAA was given total authority over American airspace, including military activity, and as procedures and ATC facilities were modernized, mid-air collisions gradually became less frequent.

National Historic Landmark

On April 22, 2014, the site of the crash was declared a National Historic Landmark, making it the first landmark for an event that happened in the air. The location, in a remote portion of the canyon only accessible to hikers, has been closed to the public since the 1950s.

Dramatizations
In 2006, the story of this disaster was covered in the third season of the History Channel program UFO Files. The episode, entitled "Black Box UFO Secrets", contained the Universal Newsreel footage of the accident narrated by Ed Herlihy.

In 2010, the story of the disaster, along with other mid-air collisions, was featured on the eighth season of the National Geographic Channel show Mayday (also known as Air Emergency and Air Crash Investigation). The special episode is entitled "System Breakdown".  In 2013, an episode from the twelfth season, entitled "Grand Canyon Disaster", also featured this accident.

It is featured in season 1, episode 5, of the TV show Why Planes Crash, in an episode called "Collision Course".

In 2015, the first season of Mysteries at the National Parks on the Travel Channel,  in the series' seventh episode entitled, "Portal To The Underworld" the crash was also featured and was mentioned as being a "supernatural event."

Literary references
In his novel Skeleton Man (2004), Tony Hillerman uses this event as the backdrop to his story.

In the Arthur Hailey novel Airport, Mel thinks that another big disaster like this incident would arouse public awareness about the airport's deficiencies.

In Colin Fletcher's 1968 account of walking Grand Canyon National Park end-to-end in 1963, The Man Who Walked Through Time, he gives an account of somberly hiking by the wreckage of the aircraft.

See also

 List of National Historic Landmarks in Arizona
 National Register of Historic Places listings in Coconino County, Arizona
 Aeromexico Flight 498
 1976 Zagreb mid-air collision
 Gol Linhas Aéreas Flight 1907
 PSA Flight 182
 Überlingen mid-air collision
 1960 New York mid-air collision
 Charkhi Dadri Mid-Air Collision
 First midair collision of airliners
 Free flight (air traffic control)
 1986 Grand Canyon mid-air collision, another airliner involved in a mid-air collision over the Grand Canyon
 Hughes Airwest Flight 706
2001 Japan Airlines mid-air incident

Notes

References

Sources
 Civil Aeronautics Board Official Report, Docket 320, File 1, issued on April 17, 1957
 Air Disaster, Vol. 4: The Propeller Era, by Macarthur Job, Aerospace Publications Pty. Ltd. (Australia), 2001. 
 Blind Trust, by John J. Nance, William Morrow & Co., Inc. (US), 1986,

External links 

  - Alternate URL with PDF
 
 
 Lessons from Tragedy Over the Grand Canyon by Jon Proctor
 Flying Blind by Gregory Rawlins
 TWA and United collision over Grand Canyon Arizona Aircraft Archaeology
 What Caused The "Worst Accident In The History" Of Commercial Aviation? Mayday: Air Disaster - YouTube Channel

Airliner accidents and incidents in Arizona
Aviation accidents and incidents in the United States in 1956
History of air traffic control
Events in Coconino County, Arizona
Trans World Airlines accidents and incidents
United Airlines accidents and incidents
1956 in Arizona
Disasters in Arizona
Burials in Arizona
Grand Canyon
Accidents and incidents involving the Douglas DC-7
Accidents and incidents involving the Lockheed Constellation
Airliner accidents and incidents caused by pilot error
Mid-air collisions
Mid-air collisions involving airliners
National Historic Landmarks in Arizona
National Register of Historic Places in Coconino County, Arizona
June 1956 events in the United States
1956 in the United States